Buffalo Bill Cody Scenic Byway is in the U.S. state of Wyoming and spans most of the distance from Cody, Wyoming to Yellowstone National Park. The  scenic highway follows the north fork of the Shoshone River through the Wapiti Valley to Sylvan Pass and the eastern entrance to Yellowstone. Most of the scenic byway is contained within Shoshone National Forest and is also known as  US Highway 14 (US 14), US 16 and US 20.

Route description
The Buffalo Bill Cody Scenic Byway starts in Cody and follows US 14/US 16/US 20 along the Shoshone River. The route is known for its abundant wildlife, astonishing rock formations, and recreational opportunities. The Park has facilities for camping, picnicking, boating, and windsurfing.

Beyond the reservoir, the highway enters the Shoshone National Forest. The Shoshone was set aside in 1891 as part of the Yellowstone Timberland Reserve. One of the oldest Forest Service ranger stations is situated in the Wapiti Valley. A stop at the visitor center near the station will provide you with a brief history of the area, as well as locations of campgrounds and trails. As the Indian name implies, The Wapiti Valley is home for the wapiti, or elk as well as the grizzly bear, bighorn sheep, moose, deer, and other wildlife. A sharp eye might spot these animals feeding along the banks of streams, on grassy benchlands, and on brushy slopes. Buffalo Bill Cody built his hunting lodge, Pahaska Teepee, here beneath a sheltering cliff. This building is now listed on the National Register of Historic Places. The Wapiti Valley is home to fourteen beautiful, historic lodges offering full-service accommodations, nightly, weekly, or monthly. Any of these lodges may be used as home-base while touring all of Cody Country and enjoying Cody's many fine attractions. At the head of the Wapiti Valley the highway enters Yellowstone National Park. and here the Byway ends, giving travelers an excellent route to the wonders of Yellowstone National Park.

Points of interest
Points of interest along the road include Colter's Hell, Buffalo Bill Dam, Mummy Cave and Pahaska Tepee, all listed on the National Register of Historic Places. The Wapiti Ranger Station is a National Historic Landmark.  Historic dude ranches on the byway catered to the Yellowstone tourist trade and include the Elephant Head Lodge, Absaroka Mountain Lodge and the Red Star Lodge.

History
The Buffalo Bill Cody Scenic Byway was designated as a National Forest Scenic Byway on May 14, 1991, and as a Wyoming State Scenic Byway in 1995.

See also
 Black and Yellow Trail, an auto trail linking the Black Hills and Yellowstone, which ends at Cody.

References

Shoshone National Forest
Geography of Wyoming
National Forest Scenic Byways
Transportation in Park County, Wyoming
Tourist attractions in Park County, Wyoming
1991 establishments in Wyoming